The 1986 Paris–Roubaix was the 84th edition of the cycling classic Paris–Roubaix and was held on the 13th of April.

Cycling monument specialist Sean Kelly won his second Paris–Roubaix using his deadly finish to come out on top in the final. Four riders approached the finish in the towncentre of Roubaix together: Ferdi Van Den Haute, Adri van der Poel, Rudy Dhaenens and Sean Kelly. Van Den Haute started the sprint from far away, hoping that the rest was too tired at this point in the race. Kelly, having just finished second to van der Poel in the Tour of Flanders, let the Dutch rider chase down Van Den Haute, before blazing past both Van Der Poel and Rudy Dhaenens for the win.

Results

Paris–Roubaix
Paris-Roubaix
Paris-Roubaix
Paris-Roubaix
1986 Super Prestige Pernod International